María Rosa is a 1946 Argentine film directed by Luis Moglia Barth and starring Amelia Bence, Enrique Diosdado and Alberto Closas.

The film's sets were designed by the art director Ralph Pappier.

Cast
 Amelia Bence 
 Enrique Diosdado
 Alberto Closas 
 Domingo Sapelli 
 Helena Cortesina
 Alfonso Pisano 
 Ramón Garay

References

Bibliography 
 Sergio Wolf & Abel Posadas. Cine argentino: La otra historia. Letra Buena, 1994.

External links 
 

1946 films
1940s Spanish-language films
Films based on works by Àngel Guimerà
Films directed by Luis Moglia Barth
Films scored by Alejandro Gutiérrez del Barrio
Argentine black-and-white films
1940s Argentine films